Madison Newman (born 5 October 2001) is an Australian rules footballer who plays for Adelaide in the AFL Women's (AFLW).

Media profile
On February 8 2022, Madison became the sixth guest to join sports journalism brand Featuring Faulks.

References

External links
 
 

Living people
2001 births
Adelaide Football Club (AFLW) players
Australian rules footballers from South Australia
Sportswomen from South Australia